Yang Yu (born 18 April 1985) is a professional Chinese football player who currently plays as a midfielder for Qingdao Huanghai.

Club career
Yang Yu broke into the senior side of Liaoning FC on September 12, 2006, in a league game against Dalian Shide as a late substitute in a 2–1 victory. After making his debut he would become a fringe player within the squad, however he would see enough playing time to score his debut goal against Shandong Luneng in a league game on August 11, 2007 in a 2–1 victory. Often a peripheral member of the squad it was only once Liaoning were relegated at the end of the 2008 league season and playing in the second tier before Yang Yu was given his chance to establish himself within the Liaoning team. Even during the 2009 league season when Liaoning were playing in the second tier Yang Yu would still have to wait to establish himself within the team and only became a vital member for the club during the second half of the season when Liaoning were pushing for the division title and promotion back into the top tier.

On 2 February 2018, Yang transferred to China League One side Qingdao Huanghai. He would make his debut in a league game against Dalian Transcendence F.C. on 11 March 2018 in a 4-2 victory. After that game he would become an integral member of the team that would win the 2019 China League One division and promotion into the top tier.

Career statistics
Statistics accurate as of match played 31 December 2020.

Honours

Club
Liaoning FC
China League One: 2009

Qingdao Huanghai
China League One: 2019

References

External links
Stats at Sohu.com
Stats at Sodasoccer.com
 

1985 births
Living people
Footballers from Shenyang
Chinese footballers
Liaoning F.C. players
Qingdao F.C. players
Chinese Super League players
China League One players
Association football midfielders